Freeman Williams Jr. (May 15, 1956 – April 19, 2022) was an American professional basketball player in the National Basketball Association (NBA). He played college basketball for the Portland State Vikings, where he  was a two-time All-American and twice led the nation in scoring. He began his NBA career playing  years with the San Diego Clippers, and also had stints with the Atlanta Hawks, Utah Jazz and Washington Bullets.

College career
Williams attended Portland State University, where he became the school's all-time scoring leader. He was the NCAA Division I scoring leader in 1977 and 1978, and a consensus second-team All-American in 1978. He is third in Division I history in career scoring, trailing only Pete Maravich and Antoine Davis.

Professional career
Williams was a 1978 first round draft pick (8th overall) by the Boston Celtics. His pro playing career started in 1978 with the San Diego Clippers. He finished in the top 10 in three-point field goals for three consecutive seasons from 1980 through 1982. In December 1980, Freeman became the first Clippers player to win a Player of the Month award, and the only one in franchise history until Elton Brand did so 25 years later. In the middle of the 1981-82 season, the Clippers traded Williams to the Atlanta Hawks for Al Wood and Charlie Criss.

In September 1982, Williams was traded along with John Drew and cash to the Utah Jazz in exchange for Dominique Wilkins, who was drafted by the Jazz and refused to sign. After that season (1982–83), Williams only played in 27 more games: 18 with Utah in 1983 and nine with the Washington Bullets in 1986.

In 1987, Williams played in the Philippine Basketball Association (PBA) for the Tanduay Rhum Masters, where he famously scored 82 points, including 10 three-pointers, in one game.

Personal life
Freeman had a small part in the 1992 film White Men Can't Jump, playing fictional playground legend Duck Johnson.

Williams died on April 19, 2022. He was 65.

Career statistics

See also
 List of NCAA Division I men's basketball players with 60 or more points in a game
 List of NCAA Division I men's basketball season scoring leaders
 List of NCAA Division I men's basketball career scoring leaders

References

External links

1956 births
2022 deaths
African-American basketball players
All-American college men's basketball players
American expatriate basketball people in the Philippines
American men's basketball players
Basketball players from Los Angeles
Boston Celtics draft picks
Philippine Basketball Association imports
Portland State Vikings men's basketball players
San Diego Clippers players
Shooting guards
Small forwards
Tampa Bay Thrillers players
Tanduay Rhum Masters players
United States Basketball League players
Utah Jazz players
Washington Bullets players